Pkm or PKM indicates the following:

 PKM (gene)
 Pressur-kilometre or pkm, a unit of passenger transportation quantity
 Personal knowledge management
 PK machine gun, a general-purpose machine gun designed in the Soviet Union
 PKMzeta, protein kinase C zeta type
 Pokémon, Japanese electronic games
 PKM, the station code for Pakenham railway station, Victoria, Australia